Henry Smith Williams (born 11 June 1967), is a retired South African cricketer. He played seven One Day Internationals for South Africa. Williams was a right-arm seam bowler and, after retiring, he became the bowling coach at Boland.

He and Herschelle Gibbs were banned from international cricket for six months in 2000 for match fixing. In the hearing, he admitted accepting money from Hansie Cronje to underperform in a One Day International in India. He had been bribed to concede more than 50 runs off his 10 overs, but sustained a legitimate injury and so bowled only 11 balls.

Although his suspension was only for six months, he was well into his 30s and, despite playing first-class cricket until 2003/04, he never returned to international cricket.

In February 2020, Williams was named in South Africa's squad for the Over-50s Cricket World Cup in South Africa. However, the tournament was cancelled during the third round of matches, due to the COVID-19 pandemic.

See also 
 List of cricketers banned for match fixing

References

External links 

1967 births
Boland cricketers
Commonwealth Games gold medallists for South Africa
Cricketers at the 1998 Commonwealth Games
Living people
South Africa One Day International cricketers
South African cricketers
People from Stellenbosch
Commonwealth Games medallists in cricket
Cricketers banned for corruption
Cricketers from the Western Cape
Medallists at the 1998 Commonwealth Games